The men's marathon at the 2016 Olympic Games in Rio de Janeiro took place on the Sambódromo on 21 August, the final day of the Games. One hundred fifty-five athletes from 79 nations competed. The event was won by Eliud Kipchoge of Kenya, the nation's second victory in the event in three Games. Feyisa Lilesa of Ethiopia took silver, while Galen Rupp of the United States took bronze. The defending champion going into the marathon was Ugandan Stephen Kiprotich.

Background

This was the 28th appearance of the event, which is one of 12 athletics events to have been held at every Summer Olympics. Seven of the top ten runners from the 2012 marathon returned: gold medalist (and 2013 world champion) Stephen Kiprotich of Uganda, fourth-place finisher (and 2004 silver medalist) Meb Keflezighi of the United States, fifth-place finisher Marilson Dos Santos of Brazil, seventh-place finisher Cuthbert Nyasango of Zimbabwe, eighth-place finisher Paulo Roberto Paula of Brazil, ninth-place finisher Henryk Szost of Poland, and tenth-place finisher Ruggero Pertile of Italy. Ghirmay Ghebreslassie of Eritrea was the reigning world champion. Eliud Kipchoge of Kenya was the favorite, with six major wins in the past four years after moving to the road from the track.

Azerbaijan, Georgia, Panama, the Refugee Olympic Team, and Uzbekistan each made their first appearance in Olympic men's marathons. South Sudan made its first formal appearance, though it had had one runner appear as an Independent Olympic Athlete in 2012. The United States made its 27th appearance, most of any nation, having missed only the boycotted 1980 Games.

Summary

The field size of 155 starters was an Olympic Games record as well as the 140 finishers. The previous record was 124 starters and 111 finishers at the 1996 Olympic marathon in Atlanta. The 2016 race also had the most countries represented of any Olympic marathon and despite the weather conditions a record 62 men finished under 2:20:00 to show the quality and depth of the field.

The lead pack jogged comfortably through almost the first 15 kilometers, when Eliud Kipchoge injected a little speed into the race. By that point the pack was 62 men, that went from a line across the street shoulder to shoulder to a string chasing the leader. 46 still were hanging onto the lead group at the halfway point. Nine more dropped off by 25K. Over the next 5K, the pace gradually increased, losing the defending champion Stephen Kiprotich and reigning world champion Ghirmay Ghebreslassie, though Ghebreslassie was hanging on off the back. At 30K there were only 8 still running together at the front. Lemi Berhanu seemed to be leading the increase of speed, calling back for his teammate Feyisa Lilesa to keep up. Within 2 km, the lead pack was down to four, the two Ethiopians, Kipchoge and Galen Rupp. In the next kilometer, Berhanu fell off the back. By 33K, the medalists were decided. At 35K, Rupp was just behind Lilesa and Kipchoge. Rupp lost contact at the following water station. Shortly after losing Rupp, Lilesa was immediately behind Kipchoge and apparently clipped his heels. Kipchoge was angry, motioning to Lilesa to run next to him, to use the rest of the street. Lilesa didn't respond, Kipchoge accelerated away. From that point, as the course snaked around buildings, the three leaders lost sight of each other as the gaps between them increased. Slightly less than a minute behind the leaders, Ghebreslassie was speeding past the other stragglers. At 40K, Kipchoge had 36 seconds over Lilesa, Rupp another 12 seconds back and Ghebreslassie 59 seconds behind Rupp. Over the lengthy straight finish, Kipchoge expanded his lead to 1:10, giving the thumbs up to the crowd as he finished at 2:08:44. Lilesa struggled but still held 11 seconds ahead of Rupp. Lilesa crossed his arms several times before crossing the finish line at 2:09:54 in solidarity of the protests of his ethnic Oromo people. Rupp finished at 2:10:05 still 59 seconds up on Ghebreslassie.		

Eliud Kipchoge had previously won medals on the track in 2004 and 2008; this race marked the continuation of his successful transition to the marathon distance. The difference between this and his last half marathon was 1:02:49. Kipchoge was the only Kenyan finisher in the marathon.		

The sky remained overcast throughout the race. The streets remained wet. As Athens 2004 silver medalist Meb Keflezighi, aged 41, was about to cross the finish line in thirty-third place, he slipped. Head and shoulders crossing the finish line, he did a couple of push ups on the ground before righting himself and walking over the line. Later Mohammad Jafar Moradi's hamstring seized up before he reached the finish line. He ended up crawling across the line unassisted. Federico Bruno also cramped up before the entrance of the Sambadrome. He had to finish the entire distance hopping sideways. Derlis Ayala stopped several times to assist Bruno.

The gifts were presented by Abby Hoffman, Council Member of the IAAF immediately after the race. At the closing ceremony, the athletes were presented with the medals by Thomas Bach, IOC President and Sebastian Coe, President of the IAAF.

Abdelmajid El Hissouf (originally 68th) was found guilty of a doping offence by the IAAF in 2017, and his sanction resulted in the annulment of this result; all those finishing behind him were moved up one place.

Demonstration

Feyisa Lilesa of Ethiopia was the silver medalist and as he neared the line he crossed his arms above his head – a political gesture in solidarity with Oromo protests in Ethiopia. After the race he stated: "the Ethiopian government is killing my people so I stand with all protests anywhere as Oromo is my tribe. My relatives are in prison and if they talk about democratic rights they are killed."

Competition format and course

As all Olympic marathons, the competition was a single race. The marathon distance of 26 miles, 385 yards was run over a course that started and finished at the Sambódromo.

Records

Prior to this event, the existing world and Olympic records stood as follows.

No new world or Olympic records were set during the competition.

Schedule 

Time is in accordance with Brasília Time UTC−03:00

Results

References

External links

Men's marathon
Marathons at the Olympics
Summer Olympics
Men's marathons
Men's events at the 2016 Summer Olympics